Geobacter psychrophilus is a Fe(III)-reducing bacterium. It is Gram-negative, slightly curved, rod-shaped and motile via means of monotrichous flagella. Its type strain is P35T (=ATCC BAA-1013T =DSM 16674T =JCM 12644T).

See also 
 List of bacterial orders
 List of bacteria genera

References

Further reading

External links

LPSN
Type strain of Geobacter psychrophilus at BacDive -  the Bacterial Diversity Metadatabase

Bacteria described in 2005
Thermodesulfobacteriota